Kudian or Kudeyan may refer to:
 Kudian, Lamerd
 Kudian, Marvdasht
 Kudian, Shiraz